Range Ryder and the Calgary Kid is a Canadian children's television series. It debuted on CBC Television in 1977.

External links 
 TVArchive.ca article
 

1977 Canadian television series debuts
1970s Canadian children's television series